Ray Ashby (birth unknown) is a former professional rugby league footballer who played in the 1960s.

Playing career

International honours
Ashby was selected to play for Great Britain against France while he was at Liverpool City in 1964 and at Wigan in 1965.

Challenge Cup Final appearances
Ray Ashby played  in Wigan's 20–16 victory over Hunslet in the 1965 Challenge Cup Final during the 1964–65 season at Wembley Stadium, London on Saturday 8 May 1965, in front of a crowd of 89,016.

Wigan's Ray Ashby, and Hunslet's Brian Gabbitas, jointly won the Lance Todd Trophy for man of the match in the 1965 Challenge Cup Final, it was the first time two players polled the same number of votes.

County Cup Final appearances
Ray Ashby played  in Wigan's 16–13 victory over Oldham in the 1966 Lancashire County Cup Final during the 1966–67 season at Station Road, Swinton, on Saturday 29 October 1966.

References

External links
!Great Britain Statistics at englandrl.co.uk (statistics currently missing due to not having appeared for both Great Britain, and England)
Statistics at wigan.rlfans.com
(archived by web.archive.org) Statistics at wigan.rlfans.com
1965 The Day David Almost Slew Goliath – Wigan v Hunslet
(archived by web.archive.org) Kiwis open British tours…

Living people
English rugby league players
Rugby league players from St Helens, Merseyside
Blackpool Borough players
Great Britain national rugby league team players
Lance Todd Trophy winners
Liverpool City (rugby league) players
Rugby league centres
Rugby league fullbacks
Wigan Warriors players
Year of birth missing (living people)